Harriston may refer to:
Harriston, Cumbria, England
Harriston, Ontario, Canada
Harriston, Missouri, United States